Albert Oganezov (February 10, 1949 – December 29, 2002) was a Russian handball player who competed for the Soviet Union in the 1972 Summer Olympics.

In 1972 he was part of the Soviet team which finished fifth in the Olympic tournament. He played one match.

References
Albert Oganezov's obituary 

1949 births
2002 deaths
Soviet male handball players
Russian male handball players
Olympic handball players of the Soviet Union
Handball players at the 1972 Summer Olympics
Russian people of Armenian descent